Bill or William Knott may refer to:
 Bill Knott (politician) (1921–2013), Australian politician
 Bill Knott (poet) (1940–2014), American poet
 Bill Knott (footballer), New Zealand association football (soccer) player
 William V. Knott (1863–1965), Florida state politician
 Billy Knott (born 1992), English footballer